Kampot may refer to:
Kampot (city), a city in southern Cambodia
Kampot, an alternative spelling of the Slavic drink Kompot
Kampot Province, province of Cambodia
Kampot Municipality, a municipality in Cambodia
Kampot Airport, an airport in Cambodia
Battle of Kampot, a battle happened in Cambodia (1973-1974)
Kampot (crater), a crater on Mars
Kampot pepper, black pepper grown and produced in Cambodia
Kampot languages of Brazil